Baudin Island is the name of two islands off the coast of Western Australia: